Conoculus is a genus of harvestmen in the family Triaenonychidae. It is monotypic, being represented by the single species, Conoculus asperus.

References

Harvestmen